The bushy-tailed jird or bushy-tailed dipodil (Sekeetamys calurus) is a species of rodent in the family Muridae. It is the only species in the genus Sekeetamys. It is found in Egypt, Israel, Jordan, Saudi Arabia, and Sudan. Its natural habitat is rocky areas.

Description
The bushy-tailed jird is a large mouse-like rodent with a bushy tail in the subfamily Gerbillinae. The ears are large and there are pale patches around the eyes. Dorsally, the hairs are yellowish-brown tipped with black, with the flanks being rather paler than the back. There is a sharp demarcation line between the flanks and the whitish underparts. The tail is yellowish-brown at its base, the rest being greyish-black except for the usually white tip. The tail is well furred throughout its length and held upright. This bushy tail is unique among small rodents in Egypt except for the Asian garden dormouse (Eliomys melanurus). The legs are slender and the hind feet are long, with hairless soles.

Distribution and habitat
The bushy-tailed jird occurs in eastern Egypt, the Sinai Peninsula, southern Israel and southern Jordan. It seems to be expanding its range northwards in Israel; whereas its northern limit used to be the Tze'elim Stream near Masada in southern Israel, it now occurs at Ein Gedi, west of the Dead Sea.

Status
The bushy-tailed jird is an uncommon species but the population trend is stable and there are no particular threats so the International Union for Conservation of Nature has rated its conservation status as "least concern".

References

Gerbils
Mammals described in 1892
Taxa named by Oldfield Thomas
Taxonomy articles created by Polbot